In contemporary history, the third millennium of the Anno Domini or Common Era in the Gregorian calendar is the current millennium spanning the years 2001 to 3000 (21st to 30th centuries). Ongoing futures studies seek to understand what is likely to continue and what could plausibly change in the course of this period and beyond.

Predictions and forecasts not included on this timeline
 List of future astronomical events
 List of lunar eclipses in the 21st century
 List of solar eclipses in the 21st century
 Projections of population growth
 Climate change
 Representative Concentration Pathway
 Shared Socioeconomic Pathways
 Extinction
 List of dates predicted for apocalyptic events
 Predictions and claims for the Second Coming
 Near future in fiction
 Works falling into the public domain in the United States

21st century

2000s

 See: 2001
 2002
 2003
 2004
 2005
 2006
 2007
 2008
 2009

2010s

 See: 2010
 2011
 2012
 2013
 2014
 2015
 2016
 2017
 2018
 2019

2020s

See: 2020
 2021
 2022
 2023
 2024
 2025
 2026
 2027
 2028
 2029

2030s

2040s

 2040:
 2041:
 The Antarctic treaty is scheduled to come under review.
 2042:
 September 17: A common computing representation of date and time on IBM mainframe systems will overflow with potential results similar to the year 2000 problem.
 2047: On July 1, the present "one country, two systems" arrangement in Hong Kong is scheduled to end, as it was guaranteed for 50 years starting from July 1, 1997, provided under the Hong Kong Basic Law. The agreement was raised by Deng Xiaoping to deal with Hong Kong's reunification with the People's Republic of China in 1997, and stipulated in the Sino-British Joint Declaration of 1984. What will be done is not stated in any document.
 2048: On January 14, the Protocol on Environmental Protection to the Antarctic Treaty is scheduled to come up for review.
 2049:
 December 20: The present "One country, two systems" with Macau, guaranteed for 50 years starting from 20 December 1999, provided under the Basic Law and the Joint Declaration on the Question of Macau, will expire.

2050s

 2050:
 Three-North Shelter Forest Program is expected to be completed. 
The case files surrounding the 1943 death of the former lieutenant general of the Polish Army and first Prime Minister of the Polish government in exile, Władysław Sikorski, is expected to be declassified this year by the British government. Due to tensions between The United Kingdom, The Soviet Union, and Nazi Germany, the circumstances of his death has led to disputes over whether the crash was deliberate or not. The official conclusion by the British government is that the crash was accidental, however, The Polish government refused to endorse this report on the basis of a lack of conclusive findings and contradictions within the British evidence. In 2008 an investigation was opened by the Commission for the Prosecution of Crimes against the Polish Nation of the Institute of National Remembrance, and concluded in 2013 that there is not enough evidence to prove or disprove the sabotage theory.
 2051:
 April: One of the METI messages Cosmic Call 1 sent from the 70-meter Eupatoria Planetary Radar in 1999 arrives at its destination, Gliese 777 star.

2060s

 2060:
 The Chinese government aims for China to be carbon neutral.
 2061:
 December 31: Expiration of the Singapore-Malaysia Water Agreement.
 2065:
 The process of cleanup and decommissioning the Chernobyl Nuclear Power Plant, following the 1986 Chernobyl disaster, is projected to be finished.

2070s

 2070: According to an announcement made by Indian prime minister Narendra Modi in 2021, India will be carbon neutral.
 2073: On January 1, assuming no further extensions to the term of copyrights become law in the interim, all media that was published before 1978 (including the first Star Wars film) will have fallen into the public domain in the United States. This year in particular is significant because this is the last year when the terms of the Sonny Bono Copyright Extension Act will apply; works published after 1977 will generally fall into the public domain after 70 years post mortem auctoris.
 2079: For computer software using unsigned 16-bit binary day counts and an epoch of 1 January 1900, the counts will overflow after 65,536 (216) days, which will occur on 6 June 2079.

2080s

 2085: The "secret" letter of Queen Elizabeth II will be opened in Sydney, Australia.
 2088: The University of Bologna, the world's oldest university in continuous operation, will turn 1,000 years old.

2090s

 2090: The September 11th Victim Compensation Fund is set to expire.
 2092:
 Work on cleaning up the site of the Oldbury Nuclear Power Station is scheduled to be complete in 2092 (early estimate).
 2094:
 April 7: Mercury transits Jupiter, this is the only known such event of the decade.
 2099: 
The 99-year lease for Kaufman Astoria Studios in Queens, New York City is set to expire.
Ontario regains control of the Ontario Highway 407 when its 99-year lease expires.
2099 is the maximum year that can be set on computers with BIOS firmware, as well as Microsoft's Windows XP, Windows Vista, Windows 7, Windows 8, and Windows 8.1 operating systems, and Sony's PlayStation 2 and the Nintendo DS gaming platforms.

2100s
 2100: 
On 14 March (which will be 29 February in the Julian calendar), the difference between the Julian calendar and the Gregorian calendar reaches 14 days. Since 14 is divisible by 7, this will be the first time in history since its inception that the Gregorian calendar has the same day of the week for each day of the year as the Julian calendar. This will last until 28 February 2200 of the Gregorian Calendar.
On January 1, a time capsule placed in Hòa Bình Dam, Vietnam, in 1984 is scheduled to be opened.
Silverstein Properties' 99-year lease on the World Trade Center expires.

22nd century

2100s
 2103: Per an agreement between the National Archives and Caroline Kennedy, the jacket Jackie Kennedy wore on the day John F. Kennedy was assassinated cannot be displayed in public until this year.
 FAT file systems theoretically support dates up to 31 December 2107 (though officially only up to 31 December 2099).
 2109: On April 27, a time capsule placed under the floor boards of the Old Queens Building at Rutgers University, in New Jersey, buried on 27 April 2009, is scheduled to be opened.

2110s
 The Chernobyl New Safe Confinement reaches end of designed lifetime in the 2110s.
 2110: On 19 September, a time capsule at the Plaza de Armas in Santiago, Chile is intended to be opened. It was buried in 2010.
2111: The will of Prince Philip, Duke of Edinburgh is scheduled to become public knowledge.
 2112:
 November 18: The city of Beaumont, California in the United States is scheduled to open a time capsule in honour of its bicentennial.
 A time capsule buried in Weavers Academy, Wellingborough, UK, will be opened after 100 years of being buried.
 The will of Queen Elizabeth II is scheduled to become public knowledge.
 2115:
 The first book from the Future Library project will be published, 100 years after being submitted by author Margaret Atwood.
 The One Hundred Year Study on Artificial Intelligence (AI100) initiated by Stanford University will be concluded.
 November 18: On November 18, 2015, Robert Rodriguez and John Malkovich teamed up with Louis XIII de Rémy Martin (cognac) to create a film called 100 Years. It was put into a time capsule that will remain sealed until November 18, 2115, the day of the film's premiere and the 100th anniversary of the film being made.
 2116: China Merchants Port's 99-year lease on Hambantota International Port in Sri Lanka is set to expire.
 2117: A song titled "100 Years", composed by Pharrell Williams, will be released to the public. The song was performed by Williams at a private party in Shanghai, China, in 2017. The song is said to have addressed global warming.

2120s
 2120: In November, a South African vault of thousands of time capsules containing present-day information for future generations' use will be opened, 101 years after burial. The Vault 2120 is located at Maropeng in the Cradle of Humankind and was sealed in November 2019. The vault will only be opened in the year 2120. The vault and its thousands of time capsules have been buried at least two metres underground at the Maropeng Visitor Centre.

2130s
 2132: A time capsule on Rideau Street in Ottawa, Ontario, Canada is intended to be opened that year. It was buried in 1982.

2140s

 2140: All Bitcoins are expected to be mined.

2150s
 2155: The Year type in MySQL supports dates up to 31 December 2155.

2160s

2170s
2178: On March 23, Pluto will have completed its first full orbit since its discovery in 1930.

2180s
2182: On September 24, asteroid 101955 Bennu has a 1-in-2,700 chance of impacting Earth.

2190s
 2193: A time capsule at the York Civic Centre in Toronto, Ontario, Canada is scheduled to be opened that year. It was buried in 1997.

23rd century
 2227–2247: Pluto will be closer to the Sun than Neptune for the first time since the year 1999.
 2265: Return of the Great Comet of 1861.
 2285: On March 22, Easter will occur on its earliest possible date for the first time since the year 1818.

24th century

 2333: It is projected that the Dounreay nuclear site will be safe to use for other purposes.
 2353: The date of Easter as conventionally calculated will be five weeks earlier than its hypothetical date according to astronomical principles, in a "negative equinoctial paradox". Along with 2372, this will be one of only two such occurrences between 2020 and 4000.
 2372: The date of Easter will see another "negative equinoctial paradox", this time four weeks earlier than its hypothetical date. This will be the last such occurrence before the year 4000.
 2391: Palm Sunday and Saint Patrick's Day will coincide for the first time since 1940; the "wearing of the shamrock and the palm together" was seen as presaging a great event in Ireland.
 2400: The first century leap year since 2000.

25th century
 2439 (estimated): The "Across the Universe" message broadcast by NASA in 2008 will reach Polaris.
 2464: A time capsule buried at Cape Canaveral Launch Complex 14 in the United States is intended to be opened.

26th century

 c. 2500: Climate projections predict a barren landscape for the Amazon rainforest amid low water levels due to vegetation decline.

27th century
 2640: On September 5, the 639-year-long performance of John Cage's organ work As Slow as Possible (begun in 2001) is scheduled to finish at the St. Burchardi Church in Halberstadt, Germany.

28th century

29th century

 The St. Michael's Catholic Cemetery (Happy Valley) in Hong Kong lease on Wanzai's Saint Fulan gentleman street will end after a 999-year lease, assuming no legal status changes before that date.
 2883: On January 4, the CPR (Canadian Pacific Railway) lease on the O&Q (Ontario and Quebec) will end, after a 999-year lease.

30th century

 2968: The Helium Centennial Time Columns Monument in Amarillo, Texas, contains four separate time capsules, the last of which is intended to be opened 1,000 years after the Time Columns Monument was locked in 1968.
 2999:
 The time capsule in Chinook Centre in Calgary, Alberta, Canada is scheduled to be opened on 31 December 2999 after being sealed in 1999.
 The Longplayer composition is set to finish on 31 December 2999, marking the end of the thousand-year piece of music which began on 1 January 2000.

See also
 Timelines of the future
 Anthropocene
 Foresight (psychology)
 Outline of futures studies
 Technology forecasting

Notes

References

 
Millennia